Elizabeth "Lisa" Brown-Miller (born November 16, 1966) is an American ice hockey player. She won a gold medal at the 1998 Winter Olympics.

Playing career
She graduated from West Bloomfield High School, where she participated in ice hockey, basketball and softball. She enjoys mountain biking, running and water skiing.

Providence Friars
Played four years of hockey for the Providence Friars women's ice hockey program and graduated in 1988 with a degree in humanities. She earned All-Eastern College Athletic Conference accolades as a sophomore, junior and senior. In addition, she was named the ECAC Player of the Year and American Women's Hockey Coaches' Association Player of the Year following her senior campaign. She finished her career with 154 career points on 92 goals and 62 assists. She also played one year of softball at Providence College.

USA Hockey
A member of the United States Women's National Team since its inception, Lisa Brown-Miller is one of just three players to have appeared on six teams (1990, 1992, 1994, 1995, 1996 and 1997). In 30 games with the national team, she has recorded 13 goals and 25 assists. In addition, she also appeared on United States Women's Select Teams in 1993, 1995, 1996 and 1997.

Coaching
Brown-Miller served as the head coach of the Princeton University women's ice hockey team from 1991 to 1996. During those years, her teams compiled a 60-45-5 overall record. In 1994–95, the Tigers finished the season as Ivy League Co-Champions.  In 1991–92, her first season at the helm of the program, Brown-Miller guided the Tigers to the Ivy League Championship and earned Eastern College Athletic Conference Coach of the Year honors. She resigned in 1996 to train full-time with the United States women's program. In 2019 she accepted the position of head coach at Aquinas College in Grand Rapids, Mi.

Personal life
Brown-Miller now resides in Holland, Michigan, with her wife Peggy, and two children, Alex and Morgan. Both of the Brown-Miller children played hockey. 
She coaches with the Griffins Youth Foundation in Grand Rapids.
She has 5 cats, a dog, a chinchilla, a bunny and the occasional guinea pigs. 
Miller enjoys photography and hikes in the outdoors.

Coaching record

Awards and honors
 Named the Most Valuable Player of the 1992 United States Women's National Team after scoring nine points in five games

References

External links
 bio

1966 births
American women's ice hockey forwards
Ice hockey players from Michigan
Ice hockey players at the 1998 Winter Olympics
Living people
Medalists at the 1998 Winter Olympics
Olympic gold medalists for the United States in ice hockey
Sportspeople from Oakland County, Michigan
Providence Friars women's ice hockey players
20th-century American women